Miles Gregory McPherson (March 30, 1960) is the pastor of the Rock Church in San Diego, a motivational speaker, and a former NFL football player.

History

McPherson grew up on Long Island. He attended the University of New Haven, where he majored in engineering. McPherson was the university's first player to achieve All-American honors in football and be drafted into the NFL. He was originally drafted by the Los Angeles Rams; he was cut and went on to play defensive back for the San Diego Chargers.

After battling a drug problem, McPherson became a born again Christian in 1984, and began participating in religious outreach programs.
In September 1986, he retired from football; the next week, he enrolled in Azusa Pacific University's School of Theology.
He received his Master of Divinity degree in 1991.

In 1992, McPherson founded "Miles Ahead", a non-profit international evangelical organization.

In 2000, McPherson founded the Rock Church. As of 2009, more than 12,000 attend one of the Rock's five weekend services.

McPherson spoke at the 2008 Republican National Convention. McPherson has appeared on Good Morning America, Larry King Live, The O'Reilly Factor, and other national news networks.

Bibliography
McPherson is the author of several books, including Do Something! Make Your Life Count. and God In The Mirror: Discovering Who You Were Created to Be. He earned an Emmy Award in 2007 as the producer of Master Meth, a documentary on methamphetamine.

Family
McPherson and his wife Debbie have three children. His younger brother Don McPherson is also a former NFL player.

References

External links 
 Official site

1960 births
Living people
American football defensive backs
San Diego Chargers players
New Haven Chargers football players
Azusa Pacific University alumni
American Christian clergy
American evangelicals
California Republicans
Sportspeople from Queens, New York
Players of American football from New York City